Richard Connock (died c. 1620) of Calstock, Cornwall, was an English politician.

He was a Member (MP) of the Parliament of England for Bodmin in 1593 and Liskeard in 1614.

References

16th-century births
1620 deaths
Politicians from Cornwall
Members of the pre-1707 English Parliament for constituencies in Cornwall
English MPs 1593
English MPs 1614
Members of the Parliament of England for Bodmin
Members of the Parliament of England (pre-1707) for Liskeard